The 2000 Grand Prix motorcycle racing season was the 52nd F.I.M. Road Racing World Championship season.

Season summary
Kenny Roberts Jr. fulfilled the promise of his 2nd place in 1999 by winning the championship for 2000 with 2 races to spare. The season also saw the premier class-debut of Valentino Rossi, who began the year with crashes in the first two rounds and also had a third at Valencia; nonetheless, he came in second as a rookie in the class with 2 wins and 8 podiums. Garry McCoy achieved 3 wins with his spectacular 2-wheel sliding style, and his use of  tires began a general transition to that size, though it had been used previously in 500 cc by Kevin Schwantz. It was the last time a Suzuki rider clinched the title until Joan Mir secured his maiden title in 2020 edition.

Defending champion Àlex Crivillé had a disappointing season, bothered by an undetermined illness and a new NSR engine with a power curve that was difficult to manage. Said Jeremy Burgess: "In the middle of the corner, in the transition of getting back onto the power, the engine was weak, because all the power had gone to the top. You couldn't transfer the weight with the throttle from the front to the rear without feeling this weakness. That led to a tendency to over-open the throttle... and things would happen." By the third round, Honda started going back to much of the 1999 parts, though Rossi and Burgess decided to use the 2000 chassis with the 1999 engine.

2000 Grand Prix season calendar
The following Grands Prix were scheduled to take place in 2000:

 †† = Saturday race

Calendar changes
 The South African Grand Prix was moved from 10 October to 19 March.
 The French Grand Prix moved from the Circuit Paul Ricard to the Bugatti Circuit in Le Mans' Bugatti Circuit.
 The Australian Grand Prix was moved back from 3 to 29 October.
 The Portuguese Grand Prix returned on the calendar since 1987 (when it was held on the Spanish Circuito Permanente de Jerez instead) after it was homologated for motorcycle racing.
 The Pacific Grand Prix was also added to the calendar; consequently the Japanese Grand Prix returned to Suzuka, as the Pacific Grand Prix was hosted as Motegi, an arrangement that lasted until 2003.
 The City of Imola Grand Prix and Argentine Grand Prix were taken off the calendar.

2000 Grand Prix season results

 †† = Saturday race

Participants

500cc participants

250cc participants

125cc participants

Standings

500cc riders' standings
Scoring system
Points were awarded to the top fifteen finishers. A rider had to finish the race to earn points.

500cc manufacturers' standings

250cc riders' standings

Scoring system
Points were awarded to the top fifteen finishers. A rider had to finish the race to earn points.

250cc manufacturers' standings

125cc riders' standings

Scoring system
Points were awarded to the top fifteen finishers. A rider had to finish the race to earn points.

125cc manufacturers' standings

Bibliography
 Büla, Maurice & Schertenleib, Jean-Claude (2001). Continental Circus 1949-2000. Chronosports S.A.

References

External links

Grand Prix motorcycle racing seasons
MotoGP racing season